St. Andrew's High School is a high school located in the western suburbs of Bandra, in Mumbai, India. The school is in the process of receiving its heritage status from BMC heritage committee.

Notable alumni
Alumni are known as Andreans. Notable alumni include:-

Amjad Khan, (12 November 1940 – 27 July 1992) was an Indian actor and director who appeared in over 130 films
Rakesh Maria, (born 19 January 1957) former Director-General of the Home Guard and former Commissioner of Police, Mumbai
Yasin Merchant, (born 17 December 1966) is India's first professional snooker player. He won the Indian National Snooker championships three times.
Denzil Smith, Indian Actor.

See also 
 St. Andrew's College of Arts, Science and Commerce
 St. Andrew's Church, Mumbai

References

External links 
 Official website

Primary schools in India
Christian schools in Maharashtra
High schools and secondary schools in Mumbai
Educational institutions established in 1780
1780 establishments in India